Brian Mooney, (born 2 February 1966 in Dublin) is an Irish former footballer who made his name as a skilful winger in English football. Mooney was spotted in 1983 by Liverpool playing for Irish schoolboy club Home Farm F.C. where he had won a FAI Youth Cup. He went to school at St. Joseph's C.B.S. in Fairview.

Mooney played for the Republic of Ireland national under-19 football team that qualified for the 1983 UEFA European Under-18 Football Championship where despite remaining unbeaten in a group that included eventual winners France they were eliminated. Mooney scoring against the French at Elland Road. He also played at the 1984 UEFA European Under-18 Football Championship.

Career

Liverpool
Having signed for Liverpool, Mooney immediately started to turn heads with some outstanding performances for Liverpool F.C. Reserves even breaking into the Republic of Ireland U-21s side after starring and scoring in the 1985 FIFA World Youth Championship. Breaking into the Liverpool first team however was a different matter. With a team consisting of Kenny Dalglish, Ian Rush, Craig Johnston, Ronnie Whelan and the like coupled with the fact that they were at the time the top club side in Europe it became increasingly difficult for Mooney to make a breakthrough playing in the end just one first team game in a Football League Cup tie against Fulham in October 1986. Even a successful loan spell in 1986 at Wrexham (8 games, 2 goals) only added to Mooney's desperate need for regular first team action. However, in October 1987 things took a turn for the better.

Preston
With newly promoted Preston North End struggling in the English third division manager John McGrath brought in both Mooney and Tony Ellis with Mooney initially on a months loan. Both players were an instant success with Mooney becoming the darling of the Deepdale terraces. At the end of his loan spell Liverpool agreed to sell Mooney for the moderate fee of £25,000. The next three and a half years were for Mooney a very successful period with his undoubted natural ability attracting the attention of many top flight clubs and the eye of Republic of Ireland boss Jack Charlton. In all, Mooney played 128 games for Preston scoring 26 goals and was named the club's official player of the year in 1988–89. Was voted 2nd in the clubs cult heroes

Sunderland
Although a Republic of Ireland cap eluded him Mooney did in the end earn a move to top flight Sunderland A.F.C. with the Rokerites (now the Black Cats) paying a fee of £225,000 for Mooney's services. His time at Sunderland was however a disaster with the club being relegated almost immediately and Mooney managing just 27 appearances (1 goal) in an injury ravaged two years. A loan spell at Burnley F.C. didn't help either with a now disillusioned Mooney dead set against the move, however with Sunderland wanting Mooney to play competitive games he did in his month there make 6 appearances for the Turf Moor outfit without scoring. Injury and poor form put paid to Mooney's career at Roker Park and although at the end of his contract there was interest from several other English clubs, Peterborough United being the most notable, Mooney decided that at the age of 27 to return to Ireland.

Return to Ireland
Upon his return to Ireland, Mooney signed for Shelbourne He scored in two consecutive rounds in the 1993–94 European Cup Winners' Cup. He then transferred to Bohemian in 1995 amid controversy . His last game for Bohs was in a relegation play-off in 1999 and he was then released . He then signed for University College Dublin A.F.C. where he was also studying full-time for a degree. During his time playing in the League of Ireland, Mooney played in both the UEFA Champions League and the UEFA Cup as well as playing for the League of Ireland Representative Team. After playing for Monaghan United in 2001–02, he retired.

Honours
Individual
PFA Team of the Year: 1988–89 Third Division

References

1966 births
Living people
Republic of Ireland association footballers
Republic of Ireland B international footballers
Republic of Ireland under-21 international footballers
Republic of Ireland under-23 international footballers
Republic of Ireland youth international footballers
Home Farm F.C. players
Liverpool F.C. players
Wrexham A.F.C. players
Preston North End F.C. players
Sunderland A.F.C. players
Burnley F.C. players
English Football League players
League of Ireland players
Bohemian F.C. players
Shelbourne F.C. players
University College Dublin A.F.C. players
League of Ireland XI players
Stella Maris F.C. players
Monaghan United F.C. players
Association football midfielders
People educated at St. Joseph's CBS, Fairview